The Medveczky family was a Hungarian aristocratic family living mostly in Upper Hungary (present day Slovakia) and Hungary. It was mentioned in the thirteenth century (about 1280–1290), when the family was given the title of squire. In 1355, King Louis the Great gave Ladislav and Urban Medveczky a noble title. They were also given a forest land of area 10 poplužie, situated by the Medveczky brook in Orava. In 1370, their brother Opilius was also elevated into a nobleman.

The Medveczky Family was an owner of the area of Maly Bysterec that is nowadays a part of Dolný Kubín. Maly Bysterec was originally settled as a squiral settlement that was separated from Orava Castle estate. In 1355, this land was given to Jakub and Miko defined as an area of 10 units poplužie by the Bysterec brook, which rises in Kubinska Hola.

Many family members used the title "Medveczei és Kis Bisterczei" or "Kis Bisterczai és Medveczei" referred as "Medveczky from Medvedzie" and "Maly Bysterec" or vice versa till the end of World War I. After World War I, the main head of the family used the title of the Right Honourable Count Medveczky, indicating their nobility whilst living abroad.

Some family members changed their surname at the end of eighteenth and in the nineteenth century for various reasons.  As a result, some new family names emerged, for example Ursínyi, Medve, Medvesy, Bäer, Kaftan, Tomovics, Laurovics.  These surnames were used for longer or shorter periods of time.  Many of family members returned to the original surname Medveczky later.  From the second half of the nineteenth century until the present, a second surname to the family name Medveczky have been carried on. Here are some examples: Adaca, Baer, Baher, Beno, Borsuk, Ciglieda, Fercík, Gasper, Gergel, Heretík, Holub, Hura, Jancek, Kukla, Martiš, Martinek, Matejek, Mucha, Ollo, Pavlík, Páterek, Pišút, Rapák, Šeben.

Notable members
Some members of the family acquired national and even international reputation in the field of science and arts.   For example, Ádám Medveczky is one of the most famous Hungarian contemporary conductors and István Medveczky was a veterinarian and professor at the Budapest University.

Peter G. Medveczky, graduated from the Semmelweis Medical School and is an internationally known virologist and professor in the College of Medicine at the University of South Florida.

References

External links
 Medveczky 
 The Website of the Medveczky family

Hungarian nobility
Slovakia in the Kingdom of Hungary
Medieval Slovakia
Surnames of Slavic origin